Minitran is a commercial psychiatric drug (tranquilliser and antidepressant) manufactured in Greece by Adelco S.A. and sold in form of yellow-coloured sugar-coated tablets.

It contains Amitriptyline hydrochloride and Perphenazine.

It is sold in the following forms:
 Minitran 2-10: 2 mg Perphenazine and 10 mg Amitriptyline hydrochloride in each tablet.
 Minitran 2-25: 2 mg Perphenazine and 25 mg Amitriptyline hydrochloride in each tablet.
 Minitran 4-10: 4 mg Perphenazine and 10 mg Amitriptyline hydrochloride in each tablet.
 Minitran 4-25: 4 mg Perphenazine and 25 mg Amitriptyline hydrochloride in each tablet.

Minitran is also a pharmaceutical drug for the treatment of Angina, manufactured by 3M.

It contains glyceryl trinitrate and is sold in patch form. It is sold in the following strengths:
 Minitran 5 contains 18 mg of glyceryl trinitrate and delivers 5 mg in 24 hours
 Minitran 10: contains 36 mg of glyceryl trinitrate and delivers 10 mg in 24 hours
 Minitran 15: contains 54 mg of glyceryl trinitrate and delivers 15 mg in 24 hours

It is also marketed as Discotrine in some countries.

See also
 List of psychiatric drugs
 Psychiatry
 MINITRAN computer language available on MONECS

References

Antidepressants
Sedatives